John Sallis (born 1938) is an American philosopher well known for his work in the tradition of phenomenology. Since 2005, he has been the Frederick J. Adelmann Professor of Philosophy at Boston College. He has previously taught at Pennsylvania State University (1996–2005), Vanderbilt University (1990–1995), Loyola University of Chicago (1983–1990), Duquesne University (1966–1983) and the University of the South (1964–1966).

He is the brother of writer James Sallis.

Education
Sallis obtained his doctorate from Tulane University in 1964. His dissertation was entitled "The Concept of World." He received an honorary doctorate from the University of Freiburg, Germany.

Academic interests
Sallis is well known for his work on imagination and his careful readings of Plato. He has also written on phenomenology, Martin Heidegger, Jacques Derrida, Immanuel Kant, Johann Gottlieb Fichte, Georg Wilhelm Friedrich Hegel, and Friedrich Nietzsche, among many other figures and topics. He is the founding editor of the journal Research in Phenomenology.

Bibliography 
His curriculum vitae, including a full list of publications, is available here.

Primary literature
Being and Logos: Reading the Platonic Dialogues (The Collected Writings of John Sallis) (2019, Forthcoming)
The Logos of the Sensible World: Merleau-Ponty's Phenomenological Philosophy (The Collected Writings of John Sallis) (2019, Forthcoming)
Elemental Discourses (2018)
Cao Jun: Hymns to Nature (2018)
Plato's Statesman: Dialectic, Myth, and Politics (SUNY series in Contemporary Continental Philosophy) (2018)
Shades―Of Painting at the Limit (Studies in Continental Thought) (2017)
The Return of Nature: On the Beyond of Sense (Studies in Continental Thought) (2017)
The Figure of Nature: On Greek Origins (2016)
Senses of Landscape (Comparative and Continental Philosophy) (2015)
Klee's Mirror (SUNY series in Contemporary Continental Philosophy) (2015)

Logic of Imagination: The Expanse of the Elemental (2012)
Transfigurements: On the True Sense of Art (2008)
The Verge of Philosophy (2007)
Topographies (2006)
Platonic Legacies (2004)
On Translation (2002)
Force of Imagination: The Sense of the Elemental (2000)
Chorology: On Beginning in Plato's "Timaeus" (1999)
Shades: Of Painting at the Limit (1998)
Double Truth (1995)
Stone (1994)
Crossings: Nietzsche and the Space of Tragedy (1991)
Echoes: After Heidegger (1990)
Spacings—Of Reason and Imagination. In Texts of Kant, Fichte, Hegel (1987)
Delimitations: Phenomenology and the End of Metaphysics (1986; 2nd edn. 1995)
The Gathering of Reason (1980; 2nd. edn. 2005)
Being and Logos: The Way of Platonic Dialogue (1975; 2nd edn. 1986; 3rd edn. Being and Logos: Reading the Platonic Dialogues, 1996)
Phenomenology and the Return to Beginnings (1973; 2nd edn. 2002)

See also
American philosophy
List of American philosophers
List of deconstructionists

References
Bernard Freydberg, The Thought of John Sallis: Phenomenology, Plato, Imagination (Evanston: Northwestern University Press, 2012).
Kenneth Maly (ed.), The Path of Archaic Thinking: Unfolding the Work of John Sallis (Albany: State University of New York Press, 1995). Including contributions from Walter Biemel, Peg Birmingham, Walter Brogan, Françoise Dastur, Jacques Derrida, Parvis Emad, Eliane Escoubas, Bernard D. Freydberg, Rodolphe Gasché, Michel Haar, John Llewelyn, Kenneth Maly, Adriaan Peperzak, James Risser, and Charles E. Scott, as well as a response by Sallis.

1938 births
Living people
20th-century American philosophers
Continental philosophers
Deconstruction
Tulane University alumni
Boston College faculty
Pennsylvania State University faculty
Vanderbilt University faculty
Loyola University Chicago faculty
Duquesne University faculty
Sewanee: The University of the South faculty
Phenomenologists
Heidegger scholars